Targa Resources Corp. is a Fortune 500 company based in Houston, Texas. Targa, a midstream energy infrastructure corporation, is one of the largest infrastructure companies delivering natural gas and natural gas liquids in the United States. Their operations are based largely, though not entirely, on the Gulf Coast, particularly in Texas and Louisiana. Matthew J. Meloy has been Chief Executive Officer since 2020.

History and Acquisitions 
Targa Resources was founded on October 27, 2005, and is headquartered in Houston, Texas.

In 2015, Targa Resources acquired Oklahoma-based Atlas Pipeline Partners LP and Atlas Energy LP. In 2017, Targa acquired Outrigger Delaware Operating, LLC, Outrigger Southern Delaware Operating, LLC and Outrigger Midland Operating, LLC.

In 2022, Targa acquired Southcross Energy Operating LLC for $200 million.

References

External links

Companies listed on the New York Stock Exchange
Natural gas companies of the United States
2010 initial public offerings
Companies based in Houston